Leiðarvísir og borgarskipan ("A Guide and List of Cities") is an itinerary written  by Níkulás Bergsson (a.k.a. Nikolaos), the abbot of the monastery of Þverá in Eyjafjörður, Northern Iceland.

It is a guidebook for pilgrims about the routes from Northern Europe to Rome and Jerusalem.  It contains two descriptions of lands around Norway that the Abbot seems to have acquired for his book from independent sources.

Itinerary 
In the following list there are the towns in the different itineraries described in  Leiðarvísir,:

Denmark
 Aalborg;
 Viborg;
 Hedeby.

Germany

France
 Seltz;
 Strasbourg;

Switzerland
 Basel;
 Solothurn;
 Avenches;
 Vevey;
 Saint-Maurice;
 Bourg-Saint-Pierre;

Italy

Greece
 Peloponnese;
Kos;
Constantinople;
Rhodes;
Kastellorizon;
Patara;
Cyprus;
Paphos;

Holy Land

Notes

References

Further reading
Gelsinger, B. E. (1972). "The Mediterranean Voyage of a Twelfth-Century Icelander." The Mariner's Mirror, 58(2), 155–165.

External links 
 Ericus Christianus Werlauff:  Symbolae ad Geographiam Medii Aevi, Ex Monumentis Islandicis, Copenhagen, 1821 - septentrionalia.net (Leiðarvísir in Old Icelandic, including a Latin translation) 
 Luana Giampiccolo: Leiðarvísir, an Old Norse itinerarium: a proposal for a new partial translation and some notes about the place-names
 Tommaso Marani: Leiðarvísir. Its Genre and Sources, with Particular Reference to the Description of Rome. 2012, Durham.
 Interactive map of all locations mentioned in Leiðarvísir (Marani, 2011)

Icelandic literature
Hiking trails in Europe
European Cultural Routes
Christian pilgrimages
12th century in Iceland
12th-century books
Books about Christianity